Dr. Joseph Donovan Ross (March 13, 1911 – May 22, 1984) was a medical doctor and politician from Alberta, Canada. He served in the Legislative Assembly of Alberta from 1952 to 1971.  He also served as Minister of Health in the Alberta provincial government. He was known by the name Dr. J. Donovan Ross.

Political career
Ross first ran for public office as a Social Credit candidate in the 1952 Alberta general election in the multi-member district of Edmonton. He finished fifth out of twenty-nine candidates in the first round of the single transferable vote.  In the second round he finished in a four-way tie for first place to take one of the seven seats. In the 1955 general election, he finished eleventh out of thirty candidates in the first round.  In the second round he finished fifth out of seventh place to win his second term.

The Single Transferable Vote system was abolished and the Edmonton electoral district was broken up into nine single-member districts prior to the 1959 general election. Ross ran in Strathcona Centre and won with more than half of the popular vote over three other candidates. 
In the 1963 general election, he won the highest percentage of popular vote during his political career, defeating two other candidates and winning the district with almost 60 percent of the district vote.  In the 1967 general election, he won a four-way race with just over 40% of the popular vote; the other three candidates all finished with strong showings in the race. Strathcona Centre was abolished due to redistribution before the 1971 general election, and Ross ran in the new electoral district of Edmonton-Strathcona. He was defeated by Progressive Conservative candidate Julian Koziak.

Ross served as Minister of Health for ten years in the Ernest Manning government.  He was the father of Val Meredith, a former Member of Parliament from British Columbia from 1993-2004.

References

External links
Legislative Assembly of Alberta Members Listing

|-

1911 births
1984 deaths
Alberta Social Credit Party MLAs
Physicians from Alberta
Members of the Executive Council of Alberta
People from Parkland County
University of Alberta alumni